Abbey Caldwell (born 3 July 2001) is an Australian athlete. She became the Australian national champion over 1500m in 2022.

At the 2022 Commonwealth Games 1500m race Caldwell win a bronze medal behind British pair Laura Muir and Ciara Mageean.

Caldwell is currently studying a Bachelor of Health Sciences at Deakin University.

References

2001 births
Living people
Athletes (track and field) at the 2022 Commonwealth Games
Commonwealth Games medallists in athletics
Commonwealth Games bronze medallists for Australia
21st-century Australian people
Sportswomen from Victoria (Australia)
Australian female middle-distance runners
People from Warrandyte, Victoria
Athletes from Melbourne
Medallists at the 2022 Commonwealth Games